The following is a list of films shot wholly or partly in New Mexico, United States.

Films

References

Further reading